The Battle of Chamb was a battle in the Indo-Pakistani War of 1971. The Pakistan Army attacked and captured Chamb from India on the same principle as it did during Operation Grand Slam in 1965. The Pakistan Army's primary objective was to capture the town of Chamb and surrounding areas that had strategic importance for both Pakistan and India.

Background 
Before the capture of Chamb by Pakistan, this area was under India's control. 

The town holds great strategic value. Similar to 1965, plans were made to capture this strategic town. The reason behind this plan was to deter Indians from attacking the crucial north-south line of communications passing via Gujrat.

The 23 Division of Pakistan was given the task of protecting this sector and later attacking the Chamb-Dewa sectors.

On the Indian side, the 10th Division was given the task of defence of Chamb; the Indian army believed that by attacking Gujrat and Tanda, they could guarantee the defence of Chamb. In comparison to 1965, the Indians were better prepared in terms of defences and now realized the importance of the town and sector.

Strength 
Brigadier Amar Cheema of the Indian Army, while comparing the strength of two countries during the battle, claimed that the Indian Armed Forces had superior tanks such as T-55 and T-54 who were equipped with 100 mm guns. They were said to be far superior to those of the Pakistani Type 59 tank. 

The Indian T-55 tanks also possessed APDS ammunition firing capability which the Pakistani Type 59 tanks did not have. The T-55 had a far superior stabilization system. 

Cheema also claims that there was near parity in terms of artillery but, when it came to infantry, the Pakistan army had fewer soldiers than the Indian army during the battle. He states that "it was this battle which helped in sustaining the morale of Pakistan army. The Indians, on the other hand, describe it as a most serious reverse suffered in the 1971 war".

Outcome 
Under the Simla Agreement, signed between India and Pakistan on 2 July 1972, Pakistan retained the territory it captured in the Chamb sector.

References

Further reading

External links 

Conflicts in 1971
1971 in Pakistan
Indo-Pakistani War of 1971
November 1971 events in Asia
December 1971 events in Asia